Healer is a 1994 American dramatic film starring Tyrone Power Jr., Tobey Maguire, David McCallum, John Johnston, Turhan Bey, DeLane Matthews and directed by John G. Thomas.

Plot
An ex-con has just been paroled to a work-release program where he must work off his final year as an ambulance Emergency Medical Technician in the retirement resort, Seabreeze. David McCallum plays a comedic role as the "Jackal" an opportunistic drifter who uses the emergency system as a personal taxi service to allow him to feed his drug habit and get out of trouble. Turhan Bey came out of an over forty year absence from film acting to play an elderly man confined to a nursing home who provides the main character reason to carry on in an incredibly demanding job. Tobey Maguire had one of his earliest roles as a stoned teenager in a car wreck.

Cast

Main cast
 Tyrone Power Jr. as Nickel (credited as Tyrone Power)
 John R. Johnston as Brent (credited as John R. Johnson)
 Turhan Bey as Igor Vostovich
 DeLane Matthews as Francie
 David McCallum as The Jackal
 Lee Patterson as Sergeant Gaylor

Supporting cast
 Tobey Maguire as Teenager
 Jeanne Stawiarski as Waitress (uncredited)

References

External links

Film.com
Reelzchannel.com

1994 films
1990s English-language films